Cruithne may refer to:
Cruthin, also known as Cruithne, a people of early Ireland
3753 Cruithne, near-Earth asteroid